Gheorghe Andriev (born 15 April 1968) is a Romanian sprint canoeist who competed from the late 1980s to the late 1990s. Competing in three Summer Olympics, he won a bronze medal in the C-2 500 m event at Atlanta in 1996.

Andriev also won eight medals at the ICF Canoe Sprint World Championships with a gold (C-2 500 m: 1994), six silvers (C-2 1000 m: 1990, 1998; C-2 10000 m: 1990, 1991; C-4 500 m: 1998, 1999), and one bronze (C-4 200 m: 1999).

References

1968 births
Canoeists at the 1988 Summer Olympics
Canoeists at the 1992 Summer Olympics
Canoeists at the 1996 Summer Olympics
Living people
Olympic canoeists of Romania
Olympic bronze medalists for Romania
Romanian male canoeists
Olympic medalists in canoeing
ICF Canoe Sprint World Championships medalists in Canadian
Medalists at the 1996 Summer Olympics